The Diving competition at the 2014 Central American and Caribbean Games was held in Veracruz, Mexico.

The tournament was scheduled to be held from 25 to 30 November at the Leyes de Reforma Aquatic Center.

Medal summary

Men's events

Women's events

Medal table

References

External links
Official Website

2014 Central American and Caribbean Games events
2014 in diving
2014